

Portugal
 Angola – José de Almeida e Vasconcellos de Soveral e Carvalho, Governor (1784–1790)
 Macau –
 Bernardo Aleixo de Lemos e Faria, Governor of Macau (1783–1788)
 Francisco Xavier de Mendonca Corte-Real, Governor of Macau (1788–1789)

Great Britain
 New South Wales – Arthur Phillip, Governor of New South Wales (26 January 1788 – 1792)

Spain
 New Spain – Manuel Antonio Flórez, Viceroy of New Spain (1787–1789)
 New Granada – Antonio Caballero y Góngora, viceroy of New Granada (1782–1789)

Colonial governors
Colonial governors
1788